Hacı Bayram Veli Camii is a mosque in old Ankara. Along with Kocatepe Mosque it is one of the best known mosques in Ankara. Hacı Bayram Mosque was built during the Ottoman Empire period. It was named after the Turkish Sufi and poet Hacı Bayram-ı Veli on behalf of the latter. Hacı Bayram Mosque is one of the touristic places of Ankara. The site was added in 2016 to the tentative list of UNESCO World Heritage Sites in Turkey.

Geography
The mosque is situated in Hacı Bayram Veli Street of Ankara. There are parks and tombs around Hacı Bayram Mosque. Mosque is accessible by city bus and metro. The mosque is next to the Temple of Augustus.

See also
Hacı Bayram-ı Veli
Haji Bektash Veli Complex

References

External links

Mosques in Ankara
Ottoman mosques in Turkey
Altındağ, Ankara
15th-century mosques
Tourist attractions in Ankara
Religious buildings and structures completed in 1428
World Heritage Tentative List for Turkey